The 2018 election for the leader of the Welsh political party Plaid Cymru began on 7 August. Voting closed at midnight on 27 September. Adam Price was declared the winner on 28 September, defeating the two other candidates.

A prospective leadership election was first announced after Rhun ap Iorwerth, Assembly Member (AM) for Ynys Môn and Adam Price, AM for Carmarthen East and Dinefwr, both declared their intention to challenge the incumbent leader, Leanne Wood. Speculation about a leadership election arose after what were perceived to be disappointing showings in recent elections, which led some figures within the party to comment that Plaid was potentially stagnant.

Background

Leanne Wood was elected leader of Plaid Cymru in March 2012 with 57% of the vote, defeating Elin Jones and Dafydd Elis-Thomas.

Under Plaid Cymru's constitution, the leader is subject to re-election every two years, but this is usually uncontested. The window for any leadership challenge closed on 4 July 2018, when Wood was challenged by two of her Assembly colleagues. Wood submitted her nomination papers in June 2018.

Wood admitted that she was preparing to resign following Plaid's results in the 2017 General Election until the result in Ceredigion came through showing a Plaid Cymru gain. During the summer of 2017, Rhun ap Iorwerth publicly announced that it would be 'very probable' that he would stand when a vacancy arose. On 13 June 2018 Wood stated that she would resign as leader in 2021 if she failed to become First Minister. She had previously stated that she would welcome any challenge to her leadership. On 14 June it was revealed that a letter had been circulated by AMs Llyr Huws Gruffydd, Siân Gwenllian and Elin Jones, asking colleagues to consider putting their names forward. The Carmarthenshire Plaid council group wrote to encourage Adam Price to stand against Wood.

On 26 June former MP Elfyn Llwyd said in a BBC Radio Cymru podcast that "[Plaid Cymru has] been standing still for five to seven years now and perhaps that suggests that it's time to change the team." On 1 July 2018, fifty-three (out of about 200) of Plaid Cymru's principal Councillors wrote to pledge their allegiance to Leanne Wood ahead of any potential leadership challenge.

Campaign

On 4 July 2018, both Rhun ap Iorwerth and Adam Price formally announced that they would be challenging Wood for the party leadership. Wood reaffirmed her plan to stand as a candidate in the ensuing election. Whilst Wood is seen as ideologically close to Labour leader Jeremy Corbyn, ap Iorwerth is considered more willing to work with the Conservative Party, while Price has advocated "equidistance", advocating for Plaid Cymru to position itself equally between the Labour Party and the Conservative Party.

Wood ruled out making any sort of deal with the Conservatives after the 2021 assembly election, while Adam Price ruled out a coalition deal with either the Conservative Party or the Labour Party.

Price proposed changing the name of the party to the "New Wales Party", and set out a timeline for Welsh independence by 2030.

The candidates disagreed about Wylfa Newydd, a proposed nuclear power station on Anglesey. Adam Price opposed it, describing it as "incompatible with independence", whilst ap Iorwerth, who represents the area in the Assembly, supported the scheme. Wood said that the party would review its energy policies if she were to be re-elected.

In July, Price proposed increasing income tax by 1p to fund education. In August, he proposed reducing all income tax rates by 9p as well as abolishing business rates and council tax. He said that this second proposal would be funded by a 3% land value tax levied on non-agricultural land.

Ap Iorwerth proposed a new infrastructure commission, and increasing the proportion of government procurement spending inside Wales.

Hustings

Hustings were held across Wales during the campaign period in September. The location and dates were as follows:

 4 September – Pontypridd
 5 September – Neath
 6 September – Blackwood
 8 September – Carmarthen
 10 September – Bangor
 11 September – Llangollen
 12 September – Porthmadog
 17 September – Aberystwyth

Candidates

Results 
The winner was declared on 28 September.

References

External links
 Election information (English)
 Election information (Welsh)

2018
2018 in Wales
Political party leadership elections in Wales
Plaid Cymru leadership election